Lake Fitri is located in the center of Chad about 300 km east of N’Djamena. The size of this lake can triple in wetter years. The principal river feed is the seasonal Batha River which carries water from the Ouaddai massif to the west.

Similarly to Chad's other lake, Lake Chad, it is not quite as large as it once was. It has been designated under the Ramsar Convention as a Wetland of International Importance. The normally permanent lake may dry out during severe drought periods, such as occurred at the beginning of the twentieth century and again in 1984–1985.

References

Fitri
Batha Region
Ramsar sites in Chad